Mackenzie McKee (née Douthit, born October 17, 1994) is an American reality television personality from Miami, Oklahoma. She received public attention after being cast in the reality television series 16 and Pregnant in 2011, which documented the pregnancies and first months of motherhood for several young women. Later that year she was cast in the spin-off series Teen Mom 3 and appeared in its first and only season of that show, alongside Briana DeJesus, Alex Sekella and Katie Yeager, in 2013. McKee joined the cast of Teen Mom OG following the departure of Bristol Palin from the show in August 2019.

Personal life 
Mackenzie Douthit was born in Miami, Oklahoma to Angie and Brad Douthit.

Douthit became pregnant with her first child with then-boyfriend, Josh McKee, and gave birth to their son, Gannon Dewayne McKee, via c-section on September 12, 2011. Douthit and McKee married on August 17, 2013. 

The McKees welcomed their second child, a girl, named Jaxie Taylor, on February 7, 2014 via emergency c-section. The couple's third child, another son Broncs Weston, was born on August 15, 2016 via emergency c-section.
MacKenzie's mom, Angie Douthit died of lung cancer on December 9, 2019. On July 26, 2022, Douthit announced she and McKee had separated.

References 

Living people
Participants in American reality television series
People from Miami, Oklahoma
1994 births